Afonso Guerreiro (born ) is a Portuguese male volleyball player for S.L. Benfica and the Portugal men's national volleyball team.

Honours
Benfica
Portuguese First Division: 2012–13
Portuguese Super Cup: 2019

References

External links
 profile at FIVB.org

1994 births
Living people
Portuguese men's volleyball players
S.L. Benfica volleyball players
Place of birth missing (living people)